Ailsa Jean Mainman  is a British archaeologist and pottery specialist.

Career
Mainman completed her PhD at the University of Sheffield and is now a research associate at the University of York. She is a former Assistant Director of York Archaeological Trust.

She was elected as a Fellow of the Society of Antiquaries of London on 12 January 1989.

Personal life
In 1991 Mainman married fellow archaeologist Richard Hall (1949–2011). In 2014 Mainman fulfilled her late husband’s "last wish" by helping to  publish the final volume in a progressive series of publications about York Archaeological Trust's excavations of Jorvik.

Select publications
MacGregor, A., Mainman, A. J. and Rogers, N. S. H. 1999. Craft, industry and everyday life: bone, antler, ivory and horn from Anglo-Scandinavian and medieval York (Archaeology of York 17/12). York, York Archaeological Trust.
Mainman, A. J. and Rogers, N. S. H. 2000. Craft, Industry, and Everyday Life: Finds from Anglo-Scandinavian York (Archaeology of York 17/14). York, York Archaeological Trust.
Mainman, A. J. and Jenner, A. 2013. Medieval Pottery from York (Archaeology of York 16/9). York, York Archaeological Trust.
Mainman, A. J. and Hall, R. 2015. "Eoforwic: Post Roman and Anglian  York", The British Historic Town Atlas Vol V.

References

External links
Ailsa Mainman's publications as listed on the Archaeology Data Service

British women archaeologists
British archaeologists
Fellows of the Society of Antiquaries of London
21st-century archaeologists
Year of birth missing (living people)
Living people
York Archaeological Trust
21st-century British women writers